Eastwind Airlines was a start-up airline formed in mid-1995 and headquartered in Trenton, New Jersey, United States, and later in Greensboro, North Carolina. Jim McNally, a former Price Waterhouse analyst who had headed that firm's recovery teams when several other airlines sought management and investment help, founded the airline. McNally's paper airline found a benefactor in UM Holdings, a Haddonfield, New Jersey-based investment company, which provided investment capital.

The airline began in August 1995. Eastwind chose Trenton as no major airlines served Trenton and the airline believed that it could attract passengers from Philadelphia and New York City. The headquarters moved to Greensboro in 1996 after Continental Airlines ended the Continental Lite operations in Greensboro.

Destinations

The airline served the following destinations in the eastern U.S. at various times during its existence:

Florida
Fort Lauderdale (Fort Lauderdale-Hollywood International Airport)
Jacksonville, Florida (Jacksonville International Airport)
Orlando (Orlando International Airport)
Saint Petersburg (Saint Petersburg Clearwater International Airport)
Tampa (Tampa International Airport)
West Palm Beach (Palm Beach International Airport)

Georgia
Atlanta (Hartsfield-Jackson Atlanta International Airport)

Massachusetts
Boston (Logan International Airport)

New Jersey
Trenton (Trenton-Mercer Airport)

New York
Rochester (Greater Rochester International Airport)
New York (LaGuardia Airport)

North Carolina
Greensboro/High Point/Winston-Salem (Piedmont Triad International Airport)

Pennsylvania
Philadelphia (Philadelphia International Airport)
Pittsburgh (Pittsburgh International Airport)

Rhode Island
Providence (T.F. Green Airport)

Virginia
Richmond (Richmond International Airport)
Washington, DC area (Washington Dulles International Airport)

Fleet
At the height of the airline's operation in 1998, it operated a fleet of three Boeing 737-200 and two Boeing 737-700 aircraft. Throughout its history, Eastwind owned a total of five first-generation 737-200, two were already sold for scrap in 1997.

Incidents

On June 9, 1996 Eastwind Airlines Flight 517, a Boeing 737-2H5 experienced a reported loss of rudder control while on approach to Richmond from Trenton. There was one minor injury to a flight attendant and no damage to the airplane as a result of the incident. At the time of the event the airplane's airspeed was about 250 knots and at 4,000 feet MSL. On approach the crew experienced unexpected movement of the rudder causing the airplane rolling to the right. The crew applied opposite rudder to keep the plane from rolling over. Thirty-seconds later the plane righted itself back to normal flight. As the crew performed the emergency checklist the plane again rolled over to the right. Another thirty-seconds went by before the plane snapped back to level. The crew declared an emergency and landed safely in Richmond. Investigation of this incident would later help solve two other unsolved accidents: United Airlines Flight 585 and USAir Flight 427.

On July 17, 1996 Eastwind Airlines Flight 507 to Trenton-Mercer Airport, operated by the same aircraft that had suffered the rudder incident a month prior on Flight 517, described the first reports of TWA Flight 800 exploding.

Financial problems
Due to the short runway at Trenton-Mercer Airport, the airline served Philadelphia for a short time, but consolidated its flights back to Trenton, New Jersey in early 1999 when Delta Air Lines terminated their contract to handle ground services.

By 1999, the airline was in dire straits, facing some performance concerns as well as severe financial trouble.  In July 1999, the airline terminated several senior managers including its CEO.

The airline's financial situation deteriorated when two new Boeing 737-700 aircraft were purchased in 1997.  Service issues created tension with its customers, resulting in large numbers of complaints filed with the FAA.  In 1999, two passengers in Greensboro who feared being stranded in Greensboro refused to get off an airplane forcing the captain to call authorities.

While the airline's management refused to file for bankruptcy, in October 1999, three creditors filed a petition for involuntary bankruptcy in an effort to force the airline to liquidate.  The airline ceased all operations shortly afterwards. The two 737-700s were acquired by Southwest Airlines and Shanghai Airlines, while the last three 737-200s were withdrawn from the fleet and permanently retired (one remains in use as a fire trainer, and the rest were scrapped in 2000).

Thanksgiving Day 1998
On the morning of Thanksgiving Day 1998 passengers in Boston were greeted at Eastwind check-in counter with simple sign reading "Indefinite Delay" and no staff present whatsoever. Most passengers were accommodated by other airlines for minimal fees.

See also 
 List of defunct airlines of the United States

References

External links

Eastwind Airlines Website Circa 1998 (Courtesy of Archive.org)

 
Defunct airlines of the United States
Airlines established in 1995
Airlines disestablished in 1999
Companies based in Trenton, New Jersey
Companies based in Greensboro, North Carolina
Defunct companies based in New Jersey
Defunct companies based in North Carolina
1995 establishments in New Jersey
1999 disestablishments in North Carolina
Airlines based in New Jersey